Arthur Edward Caldwell (23 February 1886 – 26 July 1915) was an Australian rules footballer who played for the St Kilda Football Club in the Victorian Football League (VFL).

He served overseas in the First AIF. He was badly wounded in action at Gallipoli on 14 July 1915, and died of his wounds on 18 July 1915.

Family
The son of Thomas Caldwell and Agnes Caldwell (1854–1907), née Smith, Arthur Edward Caldwell was born at Young, New South Wales on 23 February 1886.

Siblings
He had nine brothers and sisters, including:
 Robert John Caldwell (1876-1927): Williamstown footballer.
 Thomas Campbell Caldwell (1879-1960): served in the First AIF, and was awarded the Military Medal in 1917.
 James McIlwrick Caldwell (1888–1929):  South Melbourne, Williamstown, Footscray (VFA), and Perth footballer.
 Joseph Albury Caldwell (1893–1966): served in the First AIF.

Football

Williamstown (VFA)
He played 84 games for Williamstown in the Victorian Football Association (VFA) over eight seasons (1902 to 1910).

In the Final match of the 1907 VFA season, played on 28 September 1907, in which Williamstown won the VFA Premiership, 7.10 (52), against West Melbourne 3.15 (34), Arthur Caldwell played on one wing, and his brother, Jim, played on the other.

St Kilda (VFL)
Caldwell made his debut for St Kilda in the 1909 VFL season, playing eight games.

Military service
Employed as a compositor for The  Williamstown Advertiser, Caldwell enlisted in the Australian Imperial Forces (AIF) at the beginning of World War I, served in the 4th Battalion and was sent overseas to Gallipoli.

Death
After being severely wounded (gunshot wounds in spine and arm) on 14 July 1915 in the fighting at Gallipoli, Caldwell was evacuated to Malta on 18 July 1915.

He died in a military hospital in Valletta on 26 July 1915.

He is buried at the Addolorata Cemetery, in Malta.

See also
 List of Victorian Football League players who died in active service
 List of Australian rules football families

Footnotes

References

 Holmesby, Russell & Main, Jim (2007). The Encyclopedia of AFL Footballers. 7th ed. Melbourne: Bas Publishing.
 Arthur Edward Caldwell: Sons of Williamstown.
 The St Kilda Football Team, The Leader, (Saturday, 15 May 1909), p.28
Caldwell is the St Kilda player seated cross-legged on the ground at the right of the front row, just in front of the football.
 First World War Nominal Roll: Private Arthur Edward Caldwell (1728), collection of the Australian War Memorial.
 First World War Embarkation Roll: Private Arthur Edward Caldwell (1728), collection of the Australian War Memorial.
 World War One Service Record: Private Arthur Edward Caldwell (1728), National Archives of Australia
 Roll of Honour Circular: Private Arthur Edward Caldwell (1728), Australian War Memorial
 Roll of Honour: Private Arthur Edward Caldwell (1728), Australian War Memorial
 Australian Casualties: 61st List Issued: Severely Wounded: New South Wales, The Argus, (Saturday, 7 August 1915), p.15
 Australian Casualties: 62nd List Issued: Died of Wounds: New South Wales, The Argus, (Tuesday, 10 August 1915), p.4
 Private Arthur Edward Caldwell (1728), Commonwealth War Graves Commission.

External links
 
 
 Arthur Caldwell, The VFA Project.
 Grave Headstone, Addolorata Cemetery, Malta, Collection of Australian War Museum.

1886 births
1915 deaths
Australian rules footballers from New South Wales
St Kilda Football Club players
Williamstown Football Club players
Australian military personnel killed in World War I
People from Young, New South Wales
Burials at Addolorata Cemetery, Paola